Charles Willard "Bolo" Perdue (May 10, 1916 – March 31, 1988) was an American football end who played for processional in the National Football League (NFL) for the New York Giants and in the All-America Football Conference (AAFC) for the Brooklyn Dodgers.  Born in Thomasville, North Carolina, Perdue played college football at Duke University.  He was drafted in the 16th round of the 1940 NFL Draft by the Washington Redskins.

References

1916 births
1988 deaths
American football ends
Brooklyn Dodgers (AAFC) players
Duke Blue Devils football players
New York Giants players
Saint Mary's Pre-Flight Air Devils football players
People from Thomasville, North Carolina
Players of American football from North Carolina